The Irish Classic was an invitational professional snooker tournament for Irish and Northern Irish players.

History 
The event was first held in the 2007/2008 season in Dublin, Republic of Ireland, and was organised by Fergal O'Brien. The event was last held at the Celbridge Snooker Club, Kildare, Republic of Ireland in 2011.

Winners

References

 
Recurring sporting events established in 2007
Recurring events disestablished in 2011
2007 establishments in Ireland
2011 disestablishments in Ireland
Snooker non-ranking competitions
Sport in County Kildare
Snooker competitions in Ireland
Defunct snooker competitions